Hypnota (also sometimes Hypnotic Woman) is a fictional character appearing in DC Comics publications and related media, commonly as a recurring adversary of the superhero Wonder Woman. Created by writer William Moulton Marston and artist Harry G. Peter, the character debuted in 1944 in Wonder Woman #11 as a stage magician and human trafficker with powerful superhuman mind-control abilities. The gender presentation of her stage persona, Hypnota the Great, was that of an ostensibly male figure in Orientalized Middle-Eastern costume, complete with a false mustache and goatee. Though initially appearing to disguise her gender to deflect criminal suspicion (a genderplay trope Marston incorporated into several other foes he created to battle Wonder Woman, including Doctor Poison and the Blue Snowman), Hypnota made subsequent Golden Age appearances in her masculine stage garb; even after her supposedly "true" gender identity was revealed, she chose to present as a man  – a move that might be understood in the 21st century as genderqueer. The Modern Age Hypnota, renamed Hypnotic Woman, has abandoned her false facial hair and is now written and drawn as a cisgender woman, albeit one who wears a somewhat masculine costume similar to her Golden Age look: a closed-front vest, salwar and a man's turban.

Fictional character biography

Pre-Crisis
A stage magician who conceals her gender via masculine costume and false facial hair, Hypnota was accidentally shot in the head during the rehearsal of one of her act's illusions. Experimental surgery saved her life, but it also released a "blue electric ray of dominance" from her "mid-brain", granting her the ability to mesmerize others with a glance.

Hypnota uses this new talent both in her stage act and in crime, including the selling of her mesmerized victims to slave merchants from the planet Saturn. Hypnota hypnotizes her twin sister, Serva, into becoming her assistant on stage and in crime. When Saturn's slave trade in Earthlings is banned as part of a peace treaty with Earth, Hypnota, hoping to revitalize her source of revenue, steals America's contingency defense plans against the ringed world in order to foment hostility and break the treaty. Her warmongering efforts attract the attention of Wonder Woman. Hypnota battles Wonder Woman with the unwilling aid of Hypnota's twin sister Serva. Hypnota hypnotizes Wonder Woman a number of times, making her publicly humiliate herself and help her in her crimes and warmongering. Finally Wonder Woman breaks free of Hypnota's control and frees Serva from hypnosis, stopping Hypnota with the aid of a mirror that causes Hypnota to hypnotize herself.

Hypnota, like many of Wonder Woman's enemies, is sentenced to prison on the Amazon penal colony Transformation Island. She, Blue Snowman, and 6 other super-villains later escape and pool their talents as Villainy Inc. Led by the Saturnian slaver Eviless, they become the evil eight. Hypnota rehypnotizes Wonder Woman temporarily during a fight with her, but her control is broken once again. The evil eight are again defeated by Wonder Woman. Whether or not Hypnota's masculine garb, which concealed her true gender throughout most of her first appearance and which she retained in her second appearance, is to be taken as anything more than a stage affectation is unclear.

Post-Crisis
In the Post-Crisis, Hypnota is referred to as "Hypnotic Woman".

Future State
Hypnota, now calling herself again Hypnotic Woman is a member of Amanda Waller's Justice Squad, using her powers of illusionism to disguise herself as Wonder Woman.

DC Rebirth
After the events of DC Rebirth, Hypnota was briefly seen in a jailbreak with other members of the Suicide Squad from the Future State universe.

Powers and abilities
Hypnota could project "blue hypnotic rays" from her eyes and hands, which could control the minds of anyone who fell under the rays' influence.

Other versions

Wonder Woman: Black and Gold
Hypnota appears in the anthology series Wonder Woman: Black & Gold. In the story "Love Failed" by Andrew MacLean, Hypnota is depicted as an elderly illusionist who forms a self-help cult known as the Guiding Light. After Wonder Woman's friend Theresa is inducted into the cult, she confronts Hypnota on the psychic plane. The battle results in Wonder Woman stripping Hypnota of her power and leaving her in her chamber.

See also
 List of Wonder Woman enemies

References

External links
 Hypnota, Gay League Profile

Characters created by William Moulton Marston
Comics characters introduced in 1944
DC Comics characters who have mental powers
DC Comics LGBT supervillains
DC Comics female supervillains
DC Comics metahumans
Golden Age supervillains
Fictional cross-dressers
Fictional hypnotists and indoctrinators
Fictional stage magicians
Wonder Woman characters
Characters created by H. G. Peter